Gustavo Tempone (born 14 April 1971) is a Peruvian footballer. He played in five matches for the Peru national football team from 2000 to 2001. He was also part of Peru's squad for the 2001 Copa América tournament.

References

External links
 

1971 births
Living people
Peruvian footballers
Peru international footballers
Association football midfielders
Sportspeople from Mar del Plata